Saint Basil Academy may refer to:

 Saint Basil Academy (Garrison, New York)
 Saint Basil Academy (Jenkintown, Pennsylvania)